Vance Jack Walker (born April 26, 1987) is a former American football defensive end. He was drafted by the Atlanta Falcons in the seventh round of the 2009 NFL Draft. He played high school football at Fort Mill High School and college football for the Georgia Tech Yellow Jackets.

Professional career

Atlanta Falcons
Walker was selected in the seventh round (210th overall) in the 2009 NFL Draft. Falcons re-signed Walker to a one-year, $1.26 million contract on March 13, 2012.

Oakland Raiders
Walker signed with the Oakland Raiders on March 18, 2013.

Kansas City Chiefs
On March 14, 2014, he signed a three-year-deal with the Kansas City Chiefs. He was released by the team on March 6, 2015.

Denver Broncos
On March 12, 2015, Walker signed with the Denver Broncos. On February 7, 2016, Walker was part of the Broncos team that won Super Bowl 50. In the game, the Broncos defeated the Carolina Panthers by a score of 24–10. Walker recorded two tackles in the Super Bowl. On August 19, 2016, Walker was placed on the Broncos' injured reserve.

References

External links
Denver Broncos bio
Kansas City Chiefs bio
Oakland Raiders bio
Georgia Tech Yellow Jackets bio

1987 births
Living people
Players of American football from Cincinnati
American football defensive tackles
Georgia Tech Yellow Jackets football players
Atlanta Falcons players
Oakland Raiders players
Kansas City Chiefs players
Denver Broncos players